Michael Lee Zentic (born November 22, 1963) is a former American football center in the National Football League for the Dallas Cowboys. He played college football at Oklahoma State University.

Early years
Zentic attended Lincoln East High School, where he was coached in football by his father Lee. He received All-conference honors as a senior. He enrolled at Division II Northwest Missouri State University, where he was named a starter at center.

He transferred to Oklahoma State University after his third year. As a senior, he was named the starter at offensive tackle in the fifth game of the season against the University of Nebraska, after not being able to beat Tony Wilkins for the starting center position.

Professional career

Dallas Cowboys
Zentic was signed as an undrafted free agent by the Dallas Cowboys after the 1987 NFL Draft. He was waived on September 1.

After the NFLPA strike was declared on the third week of the 1987 season, those contests were canceled (reducing the 16 game season to 15) and the NFL decided that the games would be played with replacement players. He was re-signed to be a part of the Dallas replacement team that was given the mock name "Rhinestone Cowboys" by the media. He started 3 games at center. He was cut on October 20, at the end of the strike.

Kansas City Chiefs
On July 11, 1988, he was signed as a free agent by the Kansas City Chiefs. He was released on August 22.

References

1963 births
Living people
Sportspeople from Lincoln, Nebraska
Players of American football from Nebraska
American football centers
Northwest Missouri State Bearcats football players
Oklahoma State Cowboys football players
Dallas Cowboys players
National Football League replacement players